Bertschy is a surname. Notable people with the surname include: 

Christoph Bertschy (born 1994), Swiss ice hockey player
Kathrin Bertschy (born 1979), Swiss economist and politician
Paul Max Bertschy (1840–1911), Baltic German architect
René Bertschy (1912–1999), Swiss jazz double-bassist and vocalist

See also
Bertschy House, a house in Bentonville, Arkansas, US